Cyrielle Clair (born 1 December 1955) is a French actress. She has appeared in 55 films and television shows since 1978. Clair starred in the 1983 film La Belle captive, which was entered into the 33rd Berlin International Film Festival.

Selected filmography
 Le Professionnel (1981) as Alice Ancelin
 La Belle captive (1983) as Sara Zeitgeist
 Sword of the Valiant (1984) as Linet
 Code Name: Emerald (1985) as Claire Jouvet
 Väter und Söhne – Eine deutsche Tragödie (1986) as Anni
 Sword of Gideon (1986) as Jeanette Von Lesseps
 Counterstrike (1990–1991) as Nicole Beaumont
 Joséphine, ange gardien (2003) as Catherine (Episode: "Belle à tout prix")
 Triple Agent (2004) as Maguy
 Frantz (2016)

Decorations 
 Commander of the Order of Arts and Letters (2016)

References

External links

1955 births
Living people
French film actresses
Actresses from Paris
20th-century French actresses
21st-century French actresses
Commandeurs of the Ordre des Arts et des Lettres